Heterocordylus is a genus of plant bugs in the family Miridae. There are about 19 described species in Heterocordylus.

Species
These 19 species belong to the genus Heterocordylus:

 Heterocordylus alutaceus Kulik, 1965
 Heterocordylus benardi Horvath, 1914
 Heterocordylus carbonellus Seidenstucker, 1956
 Heterocordylus cytisi Josifov, 1958
 Heterocordylus erythropthalmus (Hahn, 1833)
 Heterocordylus farinosus Horvath, 1887
 Heterocordylus genistae (Scopoli, 1763)
 Heterocordylus heissi Carapezza, 1990
 Heterocordylus italicus Kerzhner & Schuh, 1995
 Heterocordylus leptocerus (Kirschbaum, 1856)
 Heterocordylus malinus Slingerland, 1909
 Heterocordylus megara Linnavuori, 1972
 Heterocordylus montanus Lindberg, 1934
 Heterocordylus nausikaa Linnavuori, 1989
 Heterocordylus parvulus Reuter, 1881
 Heterocordylus pectoralis Wagner, 1943
 Heterocordylus pedestris Wagner, 1959
 Heterocordylus tibialis (Hahn, 1833)
 Heterocordylus tumidicornis (Herrich-Schaeffer, 1835)

References

Further reading

External links

 

Miridae genera
Articles created by Qbugbot
Orthotylini